Thomas Brooks, 1st Baron Crawshaw,  (15 May 1825 – 5 February 1908) was a British peer.

Brooks was the son of John Brooks, a quarry owner, of Crawshaw Hall, Lancashire. He served as High Sheriff of Lancashire in 1884. In 1891 he was created a Baronet, of Crawshaw Hall in the County of Lancaster, and in 1892 he was raised to the peerage as Baron Crawshaw, of Crawshaw in the County of Lancaster.

 

Lord Crawshaw died in February 1908, aged 82, and was succeeded in his titles by his son William Brooks, 2nd Baron Crawshaw. His younger son, Marshall, was a skilled sportsman, having been British Amateur High Jump champion in 1874 and 1876, world record holder for the High Jump on three occasions, as well as having represented England in rugby union in 1874.

Coat of arms

References

Kidd, Charles, Williamson, David (editors). Debrett's Peerage and Baronetage (1990 edition). New York: St Martin's Press, 1990.

1825 births
1908 deaths
People from Long Whatton
British people of English descent
Deputy Lieutenants of Lancashire
High Sheriffs of Lancashire
20th-century British landowners
Thomas Brooks, 1st Baron Crawshaw
Liberal Unionist Party parliamentary candidates
Peers of the United Kingdom created by Queen Victoria
19th-century British landowners